Aoteadrillia alpha is an extinct species of sea snail, a marine gastropod mollusk in the family Horaiclavidae.

Description
The length of the shell attains 12 mm, its diameter 4.5 mm.

Distribution
This extinct marine species was endemic to New Zealand. The holotype was found at the sea cliffs east of Lake Ferry, Palliser Bay, and off South Wairarapa.

References

 King, L. C. "Tertiary molluscan faunas from the southern Wairarapa." Transactions of the New Zealand Institute. Vol. 63. p. 349; 1933
 Maxwell, P.A. (2009). Cenozoic Mollusca. Pp. 232–254 in Gordon, D.P. (ed.) New Zealand inventory of biodiversity. Volume one. Kingdom Animalia: Radiata, Lophotrochozoa, Deuterostomia. Canterbury University Press, Christchurch.

alpha
Gastropods of New Zealand
Gastropods described in 1933